Beat City is a rhythm video game by THQ and Universomo for the Nintendo DS. It was released on April 20, 2010, in North America, and in Europe on June 11, 2010. It was also the first and one of the only home video games to be developed by Universomo.

Production 
Production on the game took place in mid-to-late 2009 and early 2010. It was confirmed for a release in April 2010 on January 12, 2010.

Plot 
The game stars a resident of Beat City who loves music named Synchronizer. He meets a purple alien whale named Groovy Whale who gives him the ability to control music and implants a giant speaker in his head. His hometown is being taken over by an evil music-hating organization called the Cacophony, led by failed opera singer Dame Isolde Minor. With the help of Groovy Whale and his love interest, a girl he meets later named Beatrice, he must bring life, color, and happiness back to the city and start a "rhythm revolution," while also helping Groovy Whale get back to his home planet.

Gameplay 
The game is played with the DS turned sideways, similarly to Rhythm Heaven, with the action taking place on one screen, and the player must use the stylus on the other. The player proceeds through several different stages, each with its own set of rules. In most of the games the player plays as Synchronizer, but there are a few that feature other characters. There are three controls: tap, swipe (also known as flicking), and hold. Each stage begins with a tutorial where the stage is black and the player must figure out what to do. As you play through a stage, it will get increasingly more colorful and upbeat the better you do. Depending on the player's progress, you can build a set of stairs at the end of every day to help get Groovy Whale get closer to his home planet. Each stage measures your quality based on a percentage, and if you get an 80% or higher you can unlock a character in the "Beat Album," a short profile of the characters featured in the game.

Reception 
The game received mixed to positive reviews from critics and players. Some people called it "bland" and "pointless," and others criticized it for being short or for being "a ripoff of" Rhythm Heaven, whereas others praised it for having a unique plot and characters. One critic said that "(its) delightful presentation and super catchy chiptune soundtrack will get your toes tapping and your head banging in no time." One source said that "if you love Rhythm Heaven, you'll love Beat City. Simple as that." NintendoWorldReport gave it an average rating of 7.5/10.

References

External links 
 Beat City at MobyGames

Music video games
Nintendo DS games
Nintendo DS-only games
Video games developed in Finland
2010 video games
THQ games
Multiplayer and single-player video games
Universomo games